Motlalepula Thabana (born 27 February 1950) is a Lesotho long-distance runner. He competed in the men's 10,000 metres at the 1980 Summer Olympics.

References

1950 births
Living people
Athletes (track and field) at the 1978 Commonwealth Games
Athletes (track and field) at the 1980 Summer Olympics
Lesotho male long-distance runners
Olympic athletes of Lesotho
Commonwealth Games competitors for Lesotho
Place of birth missing (living people)